Dogra Law College is a private law school situated at Bari Brahmana, Duggar land in Jammu in the Indian union territory of Jammu and Kashmir. It offers undergraduate 3 years law courses, 5 Year Integrated LL.B. courses, approved by Bar Council of India (BCI), New Delhi and affiliated to University of Jammu.

History
In 1999, Government of Jammu and Kashmir permitted to establish the college and University of Jammu granted affiliation. Finally in 2000, Dogra Law College was established after the accreditation of the Bar Council of India.

References

Educational institutions established in 1999
1999 establishments in Jammu and Kashmir
Education in Jammu (city)
Law schools in Jammu and Kashmir